Dj Maaki (born December 15, 1992), is Nauruan boxer. During the 2010 Summer Youth Olympics, he lost to Puerto Rican Emmanuelle Rodriguez, but won a silver medal.

References 

Nauruan male athletes
1992 births
Living people
Boxers at the 2010 Summer Youth Olympics